is a Japanese actor.

History
Shimada was originally part of the Tokyo Grand Guignol Theater group, formed by artist Norimizu Ameya. He stayed with the group until its dissolution in 1986. One of the productions the group undertook was an adaptation of the occult novel Teito Monogatari (Hiroshi Aramata) where Shimada played the lead role Yasunori Kato.

He has appeared in films such as Makoto Shinozaki's 0093: Her Majesty's Masao Kusakari and Takahisa Zeze's Pandemic.

Filmography

Film

 Tokyo: The Last Megalopolis (1988) as Yasunori Kato
 Tokyo: The Last War (1989) as Yasunori Kato
 Rainbow Kids (1991) as Tokyo
 A Watcher in the Attic (1992) as Kogoro Akechi
 No Way Back (1995) as Tetsuro
 Sada (1998)
 Murder on D Street (1998) as Kogoro Akechi
 Sakuya: Demon Slayer (2000) as Syuzo
 The Princess Blade (2001) as Byakurai
 Vengeance for Sale (2002)
 Dragon Head (2003) as Minila
 Devilman (2004)
 69 (2004)
 Cutie Honey (2004)
 Tomie: Revenge (2005)
 In the Pool (2005)
 Route 225 (2006)
 Forbidden Siren (2006) as Policeman
 Udon (2006)
 0093: Her Majesty's Masao Kusakari (2007)
 Sad Vacation (2007)
 Kamen Rider: The Next (2007) as Shindou
 Orochi (2008)
 The Clone Returns Home (2008) as Dr. Kageyama
 Tokyo! (2008)
 Masters of Killing (2008)
 K-20: Legend of the Mask (2008)
 Pandemic (2009)
 Soup Opera (2010)
 Abacus and Sword (2010)
 Heaven's Story (2010)
 Kaiji 2 (2011)
 The Woodsman and the Rain (2012)
 Library Wars (2013)
 Angel Home (2013)
 Solomon's Perjury Part 1: Suspicion (2015)
 Solomon's Perjury Part 2: Judgement (2015)
 Maestro! (2015)
 Shin Godzilla (2016)
 64: Part I (2016)
 The Lies She Loved (2018)
 The Blood of Wolves (2018) as Kakomura
 Blue Hour (2019)
 Kohaku (2019)
 Not Quite Dead Yet (2020)
 All the Things We Never Said (2020)
 The Blue Danube (2021)
 First Gentleman (2021)
 A Madder Red (2021)
 Onoda: 10,000 Nights in the Jungle (2021)
 Pure Japanese (2022)
 Tombi: Father and Son (2022)
 What to Do with the Dead Kaiju? (2022) as the Minister for Foreign Affairs
 Shin Ultraman (2022)
 Nagi's Island (2022)

Television
 Kōmyō ga Tsuji (2006) as Ogasawara Shōsai
 Kitaro ga Mita Gyokusai - Mizuki Shigeru no Senso (2007)
 Penance (2012)
 Yae's Sakura (2013) as Maki Yasuomi
 Who Killed Daigoro Tokuyama? (2016) as Daigoro Tokuyama
 Naotora: The Lady Warlord (2017) as Ōsawa Mototane
 Hanbun, Aoi (2018) as Ichiro Tanabe
 Bullets, Bones and Blocked Noses (2021)
 Isoroku Yamamoto in London (2021) as Prince Fushimi Hiroyasu

Videogames
 Iron Angel of the Apocalypse (1994)
 Kingdom Hearts (2002) as Hades
 Kingdom Hearts II (2005) as Hades
 Kingdom Hearts Re:Chain of Memories (2007) as Hades
 Inazuma Eleven (2008) as Kageyama Reiji
 Kingdom Hearts: Birth by Sleep (2010) as Hades
 Kingdom Hearts Re:coded (2010) as Hades
 Kingdom Hearts III (2019) as Hades

Dubbing
 Hercules (1997) as Hades

References

External links
 Official Blog
 

1955 births
Living people
Japanese male film actors
Japanese male stage actors
Japanese male television actors
Japanese male video game actors
Japanese male voice actors
Male actors from Yokohama
20th-century Japanese male actors
21st-century Japanese male actors